Lehann Fourie (born 16 February 1987 in Heidelberg, Gauteng) is a South African hurdler. He competed at the 2012 Summer Olympics in London, UK.

He attended Afrikaanse Hoër Seunskool (Afrikaans High School for Boys, also known as Affies), in Pretoria.
He graduated from the University of Nebraska–Lincoln in 2010.

His personal best of 13.24s in the 110-metre hurdles is the current African record.

Competition record

External links
 

1987 births
Living people
South African male hurdlers
Athletes (track and field) at the 2012 Summer Olympics
Olympic athletes of South Africa
Universiade medalists in athletics (track and field)
Sportspeople from Pretoria
Universiade silver medalists for South Africa
Medalists at the 2009 Summer Universiade